Robert L. Belleville is an American computer engineer who was an early head of engineering at Apple from 1982 until 1985.

Belleville worked at Xerox, where he was a primary designer of the hardware for the Xerox Star. Steve Jobs is said to have invited him to join Apple by saying, "Everything you've ever done in your life is s---, ... so why don't you come work for me?" In May 1982, he became software manager for the Macintosh 128K; in August that year he became engineering manager of the Macintosh division. As Apple Director of Engineering, he played a major role in developing the LaserWriter. He resigned from Apple in summer 1985 after Jobs announced his resignation, and later worked at Silicon Graphics.

In Alex Gibney's documentary Steve Jobs: The Man in the Machine, Belleville said that the pressure of working at Apple had ended his marriage and that Jobs "[was always apparently] seducing you, vilifying you, or ignoring you", but he cried when he recalled working for him.

References

Further reading

 Belleville's account of the development of the Xerox Star. 2 videocassettes .

American computer scientists
Apple Inc. employees
Xerox people
Living people
Year of birth missing (living people)